Ulf Holm, born 4 June 1969 in Lund, is a Swedish Green Party politician, member of the Riksdag since 2002. He was a member of the European Parliament during 1995–1999. He is openly gay.

References

1969 births
Gay politicians
Green Party (Sweden) MEPs
LGBT members of the European Parliament
Swedish LGBT politicians
Living people
Members of the Riksdag 2002–2006
Members of the Riksdag 2006–2010
Members of the Riksdag 2010–2014
Members of the Riksdag from the Green Party
MEPs for Sweden 1995–1999